Franjo is a Croatian masculine given name.

In Croatia, the name Franjo was among the top ten most common masculine given names in the decades up to 1949.

Notable people with the name include:

Franjo Arapović (born 1965), former Croatian basketball center
Franjo Babić (1908–1945), Croatian writer and journalist
Franjo Benzinger (1899–1991), Croatian pharmacist
Franjo Dijak (born 1977), Croatian actor
Franjo Bučar (1866–1946), Croatian writer and sports popularizer of Slovenian origin
Franjo Džal (1906–1945), colonel in the Independent State of Croatia's air force
Franjo Džidić (born 1939), footballer and football coach from Mostar, Bosnia and Hercegovina
Franjo Fröhlich, Yugoslav Olympic fencer
Franjo Frankopan, Croatian nobleman and Latinist
Franjo Glaser (1913–2003), Croatian football goalkeeper and football manager
Franjo Gregurić (born 1939), Croatian politician, prime minister of Croatia July 1991 to September 1992
Franjo Hanaman (1878–1941), Croatian inventor, engineer, and chemist
Franjo Iveković (1834–1914), Croatian linguist and religious writer, university professor and rector of the University of Zagreb
Franjo Jelačić (1746–1810), Croatian nobleman, a member of the House of Jelačić
Franjo Klein (1828–1889), architect in the period of an early and mature historicism in Croatia
Franjo Kluz (1913–1944), Yugoslav pilot of Bosnian origin, best known as one of the founders of the Partisan air force
Franjo Komarica (born 1946), Bosnian Croat Roman Catholic prelate, the Bishop of Banja Luka since 1985
Franjo Krežma (1862–1881), Croatian violinist and composer
Franjo Kuhač (1834–1911), piano teacher, choral conductor, and comparative musicologist who studied Croatian folk music
Franjo Kuharić (1919–2002), Cardinal of the Roman Catholic Church
Franjo Kukuljević (1909–2002), Croatian tennis player
Franjo Maixner (1841–1903), Croatian university professor and rector of the University of Zagreb
Franjo Majetić (1923–1991), Croatian actor noted for his comedic roles
Franjo Malgaj (1894–1919), Slovenian soldier, military leader and poet
Franjo Marković (1845–1914), Croatian philosopher and writer
Franjo Mihalić (1920–2015), long-distance runner and Olympic medallist
Franjo Mraz (1910–1981), Croatian artist
Franjo Punčec (1913–1985), Croatian tennis player
Franjo Rački (1828–1894), Croatian historian, politician and writer
Franjo Rupnik (1921–2000), Croatian football player
Franjo Šeper (1905–1981), Croatian Cardinal of the Roman Catholic Church
Franjo Šimić (1900–1944), Croatian colonel, and later general, in the Croatian Home Guard
Franjo Šoštarić (1919–1975), Croatian football (soccer) player who competed internationally for Yugoslavia
Franjo Tepurić (born 1990), Croatian football striker
Franjo Tuđman (1922–1999), Croatian historian, writer and politician
Franjo Vlašić (1766–1840), Croatian general and ban
Franjo Vladić (born 1950), Bosnian Croat footballer who played for Yugoslavia national football team
Franjo Wölfl (1918–1987), Croatian footballer
Ivan Franjo Jukić (1818–1857), writer from Bosnia and Herzegovina, one of the founders of Bosnian modernism
Vanja Udovičić  (born 1982), born as Franjo Udovičić, Serbian water polo player and Minister of Youth and Sports

See also
 Frano (given name)
 Frane
 Fran (given name)

References

Croatian masculine given names

hr:Franjo
io:Franjo